The Olympic Truce is a tradition originating from ancient Greece that dates back to 776 BC. A "truce" (Ancient Greek: ékécheiria, meaning "laying down of arms") was announced before and during the Olympic Games to ensure the host city state (Elis) was not attacked and athletes and spectators could travel safely to the Games and peacefully return to their respective countries.

In 1992, the International Olympic Committee (IOC) renewed this tradition by calling upon all nations to observe the Truce during the modern Games. The Truce was revived by United Nations Resolution 48/11 of 25 October 1993, as well by the United Nations Millennium Declaration relating to the world peace and security.

In 1996, the Athens Bid Committee committed to revive the Olympic Truce and promoting it to the world through the Olympic flame relay. Three years later, the IOC announced the establishment of the International Olympic Truce Foundation and the International Olympic Truce Centre in cooperation with Greece. The vision was to protect the interests of athletes and sport, and to promote peaceful principles in modern day. Each host city was encouraged to embrace the meaning and spirit of the Olympic Truce in the planning and staging of the Games. As of 2022, the modern Olympic Truce starts one week before the main opening ceremony of the Olympic Games and ends one week after the closing ceremony of the Paralympic Games. The Truce has been violated three times in the modern history of the Games. All three violations have been committed by the Russian Federation, with the most recent breach coming in 2022 after the Russian invasion of Ukraine. This violation was a contributing factor to Russian and Belarusian athletes being excluded from the 2022 Winter Paralympics.

Goals
Through this global and symbolic concept, the goal of the Olympic Truce movement is to:

 Mobilize youth for the promotion of the Olympic ideals
 Use sport to establish contacts between communities in conflict
 Offer humanitarian support in countries at war
 Create a window of opportunities for dialogue and reconciliation

Initiatives
 1994 Lillehammer Winter Games: the former Federal Republic of Yugoslavia was allowed to participate in the Games of the XXV Olympiad in Barcelona and the XVII Olympic Winter Games in Lillehammer despite ongoing wars. A delegation from the International Olympic Committee (IOC) visited Sarajevo in 1994 to extend its solidarity to the city that had organized the XIV Olympic Winter Games in 1984.
 1998 Nagano Winter Games: During a time when tension in the Persian Gulf region was high, United Nations Secretary General Kofi Annan intervened to seek a diplomatic resolution to the crisis in Iraq. In a release from the International Olympic Committee, the Secretary General was quoted, "I call upon all nations to observe the Olympic truce."
 2000 Sydney Summer Games: During the Opening Ceremony, South and North Korean delegations walked in the stadium together, under the same flag. It was the first Olympic Games event where the two divided countries walked side by side.
 2004 Athens Summer Games: The Olympic Truce was promoted through Olympic Flame Relay events. The UN supported the IOC in asking the nations of the world to stop all wars for 16 days during the Games.
 2006 Turin Winter Games: During the games, athletes and officials showed support for the Olympic Truce by signing one of the three walls situated in the three Olympic Villages (Turin, Sestriere and Bardonecchia).
 2010 Vancouver Winter Games: Truce projects were rooted in an open invitation for people to 'Make Your Peace' which asked individuals to create everyday peace at home, schools, work, and in the community. Projects included: delivering Olympic Spirit Boxes filled with hockey, soccer, lacrosse, baseball, and basketball equipment to 20 Aboriginal communities in Northern Canada; an Olympic Truce Youth Dialogue with Canada's Governor General; and an art installation titled "Room to Make your Peace".

2012 London Summer Games

On 22 April 2011, a Member of the House of Lords, Michael Bates, began walking over 3000 miles from Olympia to London to highlight the opportunity to bring the Olympic Truce into reality during the 2012 London Summer Games. With the Walk for Truce, Lord Bates was successful in securing pledges from a number of governments to both sign and implement the Truce, supported on his journey by the British Foreign Office. Lord Bates arrived back in London on February 15, 2012, and continues to lobby for the cause of the Olympic Truce.

The UK promoted the ideals of the Olympic Truce both domestically and for the first time internationally. The London Organising Committee of the Olympic and Paralympic Games (LOCOG) organised truce activities in the UK including: "Get Set for the Olympic Truce" which encourages young people across the UK to learn about the history of the Olympic Truce, to debate and discuss what the Olympic Truce means to their lives and to undertake an activity to promote peace within their school or community. Materials were promoted to over 20,000 schools registered with Get Set.

Truce Inspire is a 'truce' strand of the Inspire programme through which LOCOG specifically looked for projects inspired by the London 2012 Olympic and Paralympic Games which use sport or culture to promote conflict resolution, reconciliation and peace. LOCOG approved a number of projects including: a project led by the University of Ulster which uses sport to support conflict resolution across the education sector; a project providing 200 schools with the opportunity to debate the theme of the Olympic Truce at a Model UN conference; and a project which uses sport to bring together young people from London communities affected by gang rivalry. Cultural Olympiad and the London 2012 Festival organised by LOCOG and the NGO Peace One Day is delivering a truce strand of the Film Nation Shorts project through which 14- to 25-year-olds are invited to create films focused on the truce theme. LOCOG has also partnered with Peace One Day to deliver a series of concerts as part of the London 2012 Festival.

International activities were led by the Foreign and Commonwealth Office (FCO) which together with partners promoted the ideals of the Olympic Truce internationally under the themes of:

Speaking about the FCO's work on the Olympic Truce, Foreign Office Minister Henry Bellingham said

On 28 May 2012, during the visit of Foreign Secretary William Hague to Moscow, the UK and Russian foreign ministries (in recognition of their countries shared roles as Olympic Hosts in 2012 and 2014) agreed to work together to promote and support the ideals of the Olympic Truce.

On 12 September 2012, FCO Ministers updated Parliament:

London 2012 had originally planned to showcase the Olympic Truce through the international leg of the torch relay, through a programme called “Heralds of Peace” in which the torch would pass through the home countries of Nobel Peace Prize winners. They planned for the torch to pass through 45 countries across Africa, Asia, the Americas and Europe before reaching the UK. After the international leg of the torch relay was banned in 2009, London 2012 chose to confine their torch relay to the United Kingdom, apart from a day outside the United Kingdom, in Dublin, Ireland

Logo
The official Olympic Truce logo is a graphic with three elements: a dove, flames, and the Olympic rings. The meaning behind the logo is as follows:

United Nations support

The United Nations is in support of the Olympic Truce and before each Summer and Winter Olympic Games, adopts a resolution called "Building a peaceful and better world through sport and the Olympic ideal". UN Member States are asked to observe the Olympic Truce, and work towards the settlement of international disagreements by peaceful and diplomatic means. The United Kingdom was the first ever nation to get all 193 UN Member states to sign the Olympic Truce resolution for the 2012 Olympic Games.

UN support is mainly shown through the resolution. It is also shown by the Solemn Appeals for Truce made by the UN Secretary General and the President of the General Assembly shortly before the Summer Olympic and Winter Olympic Games. The lead office within the UN system is The United Nations Office on Sport for Development and Peace (UNOSDP). The current UN Special Adviser on Sport for Development and Peace is Wilfried Lemke from Bremen, Germany. UNOSDP is situated at the UN Office at Geneva plus a liaison office at UN HQ in New York.

On 17 October 2011, the United Nations General Assembly passed a resolution, entitled "Sport for Peace and Development: Building a Peaceful and Better World through Sport and the Olympic Ideal", for member states to observe the Olympic Truce, individually and collectively. The resolution, introduced by LOCOG chairman Sebastian Coe, passed without a vote.

The United Nations website recognizes the truce as "the cornerstone of the Olympic Games in ancient times" and the "longest lasting peace accord in history".

In 2021, twenty countries (including Turkey, India, Japan, Australia, Canada, the United States, and the United Kingdom) refused to sign the Olympic Truce for the 2022 Winter Olympics. Australia and the United States considered this part of their diplomatic boycotts due to the host nation China's human rights abuses, and as a protest regarding the portion of the truce requiring signers to recognize the Olympic Games as promoting human rights and peace.

Violations
Historical failures to observe the non-binding UN Resolution are as follows:

 2008: Russo-Georgian War
 2014: Russian annexation of Crimea
 In response, the United States and United Kingdom diplomatically boycotted the 2014 Winter Paralympics, while all of the Ukraine delegation except for their flagbearer boycotted the opening ceremony.
 2022: Russian invasion of Ukraine, which began on 24 February, in the period between the closing of the Winter Olympics and the opening of the Winter Paralympics.
 In response, Russia and Belarus (who had provided military support) were banned from the 2022 Winter Paralympics.

See also
 Ancient Olympic Games

References

External links
 United Nations
 Perseus Digital Library

History of the Olympics
Ceasefires